The 2013–14 Pittsburgh Panthers women's basketball team will represent the University of Pittsburgh in the 2013–14 NCAA Division I women's basketball season. The Panthers, led by first year head coach Suzie McConnell-Serio.  The Panthers are a member of the Atlantic Coast Conference and play their home games at the Petersen Events Center in Pittsburgh, Pennsylvania.

Previous season
In the 2012-13 season, Pitt's final in the Big East Conference, the Pitt women were without a single senior on their roster. Star recruit, six-foot, 11-inch center Marvadene "Bubbles" Anderson was redshirted for the season. Pitt compiled a 9-21 record, and for the second year in a row, went 0-16 in the conference prompting the replacement of head coach Agnus Berenato with Suzie McConnell-Serio on April 12, 2013.

Season
New coach Pitt hired Suzie McConnell-Serio to replace Berenato as head coach.  The 2013-14 season will be Pitt's first competing in the Atlantic Coast Conference. Pitt returns 11 players from the previous season including seniors Asia Logan and Ashlee Anderson. 6'11" redshirt freshman "Bubbles" Anderson will see her first collegiate action. Players not with the team from last season include redshirt junior guard Abby Dowd, a former Buffalo transfer, and freshman forward Krista Pettepier who transferred to Pepperdine. Roster additions include freshmsn guard Fréderique Potvin of Montreal, Quebec, Canada, and freshman guard Chelsea Welch of Kettering, Ohio.

Roster

Schedule
On May 29, 2013, Pitt released its conference opponents for the 2013-2014 season, its first competing in the Atlantic Coast Conference. They will have home games against Boston College, Clemson, Florida State, Georgia Tech, Notre Dame, North Carolina State, Wake Forest, and Syracuse. Away games will consist of Clemson, Duke, Maryland, Miami, North Carolina, Syracuse, Virginia, and Virginia Tech. Home and away partners are Clemson and Syracuse.

Pitt's 2013-14 women's basketball schedule.

|-
!colspan=9| Exhibition

|-
!colspan=9| Regular Season

|-
!colspan=12| Postseason2014 ACC women's basketball tournament

|-
|-

Rankings

Awards and honors

References

External links
 Official Site 

Pittsburgh Panthers women's basketball seasons
Pittsburgh